Florante at Laura (full title: Pinagdaanang Buhay ni Florante at ni Laura sa Kahariang Albanya; English: The History of Florante and Laura in the Kingdom of Albania) is an 1838 awit written by Tagalog poet Francisco Balagtas. It is considered one of the masterpieces of Philippine literature. Balagtas wrote the epic during his imprisonment. He dedicated it to his former sweetheart María Asuncion Rivera, whom he nicknamed "M.A.R." and is referenced to as "Selya" in the dedication "Kay Selya" ("For Celia"). The story is loosely based on his own biography.

Form
Florante at Laura is written as an awit; the word in modern Filipino means "song", but at that time referred to a standard poetic format with the following characteristics:
four lines per stanza;
twelve syllables per line;
an assonantal rhyme scheme of AAAA (in the Filipino manner of rhyming described by José Rizal in Tagalische Verskunst);
a caesura or pause after the sixth syllable;
each stanza is usually a complete, grammatically correct sentence;
each stanza has figures of speech (according to Fernando Monleón, Balagtas used 28 types in 395 instances throughout the poem.)

Plot

Florante's tale
The son of a princess and a royal adviser, Florante grew up in happiness, showered with love. He liked to play games when he was six years old, and was almost captured by a vulture that entered in their mountain cottage, which was also followed by the attack of a falcon. He was saved by his cousin Menalipo, an archer from Epirus.

When he turned eleven, his parents, Duke Briseo and Princess Floresca, sent him to Athens, Greece to study under Antenor, a renowned teacher. There, he met Adolfo, a fellow countryman, the brightest student in their school. After five months of studying Astrology, Philosophy and Mathematics, Florante surpassed Adolfo's capabilities, talents, and intelligence, gaining popularity.

While performing during a school contest, Adolfo attempted to kill Florante because of his jealousy towards Florante's popularity. Florante's friend, Menandro, was quick enough to intervene. Adolfo headed home to Albania after his failed attempt. One year later, Florante received a letter from his father, announcing the death of his mother. Florante fainted for 2 hours from the grief.

Seven months later, Florante receives a second letter from his father telling him to return to Albania. Menandro, unwilling to be separated from him and allowed by his uncle Antenor, he accompanied him on his journey. Upon his arrival to Albania, an emissary of the kingdom of Crotona requested his assistance in the incoming war against the Persians. Florante had not the will to refuse, for the King of Crotona was his grandfather. During his stay in Albania, Florante was invited to the royal palace and was glamoured of Laura, the daughter of King Linceo. He stared at her for hours forgetting about the war then lost.

Months later coming to the aid of Crotona, Florante fought with the Persian general Osmalik for five hours, finally slaying him in the end. He stayed in Crotona for five months before returning to Albania to see Laura. He was surprised by the sight of a Persian flag waving atop the kingdom. He recaptured the palace and saved his father, the King, and Count Adolfo. He also saved Laura from being beheaded from the hands of the Emir and was declared "Defender of Albania" for his bravery, deepening Adolfo's envy and hatred.

Florante protected the kingdom once more from the Turkish forces under General Miramolin, an acclaimed conqueror. This took place in Aetolia, where he later received a letter from his father summoning him back to Albania. He left his troops in the care of his friend, Menandro, and upon returning, he was ambushed by 30,000 soldiers under Adolfo's orders and was imprisoned for 18 days. There, he learned of the tragic fate of his father and the king who were beheaded under Adolfo. Florante was then exiled into the forest and tied to the tree.

Aladin's Tale
After Florante finishes his story, it was Aladin's turn to recount his life. He first introduces himself as Prince Aladin of the Persian kingdom, son of Sultan Ali-Adab.

While walking through the forest, Aladin tells about his fiancée, Flerida. Unbeknown to him at that time, his father also desired Flerida. After returning home from a battle (revealed to be the battle of Florante and General Osmalik), Ali-Adab imprisoned the Prince, using his abandonment of his troops as the reason, and the eventual loss made the latter order a decapacitation of Aladin.

In a turn of events, Aladin was released by a general on orders from his father, with the constraint that he may never enter the kingdom again. Heartbroken, he unknowingly walks to the forest where Florante was tied up.

Reunion and peace
Aladin's speech is interrupted when they hear voices. A woman narrates her escape from a kingdom and a marriage. She speaks of her search for her beloved, a search which lasted six years. She shares that while deep in the forest, she heard cries for help, and upon finding a lady about to be tortured, she uses her bow and arrow to kill the assailant. The woman introduces herself as Flerida.

The lady saved by Flerida is revealed to be Laura, who begins to tell her story. While her love was away at war, Count Adolfo used deceit to gain popularity and turned the people of Albania against their king. Count Adolfo then rose to the throne, forcing Laura to be his queen. An army under Menandro, Florante's childhood friend, was able to overthrow Adolfo from power. Seeing all was lost, Adolfo fled into the woods with Laura as his hostage.

After hearing all this, Florante and Aladin reunite with their loved ones. Florante and Laura return to Albania to rule as king and queen. Aladin and Flerida returned to Persia, where Aladin became the new sultan as his father died of depression because Flerida had left him. Aladin and Flerida are then baptized into the Catholic faith, and the two kingdoms lived in harmony and peace.

Legacy

Modern theatre
Being a grand literary classic in the Philippines, adapting this epic for modern theatre requires skill and mastery. The said play is a staple among high school students as a classroom requirement. The Gantimpala Theater Foundation has already mastered the art of portraying the said epic. The modern group is influenced by modern pop culture.

Characters
 Florante - Defender of Albania and a good son of Duke Briseo
 Laura - The daughter of King Linseo of Albania; Loved by Florante
 Aladdin / Aladin - son of Sultan Ali-Adab of Persia, A muslim that saved and gave help to Florante
 Flerida - The girlfriend of Aladin that is being taken by his father Sultan Ali-Adab
 King Linseo - King of Albania, the father of Laura
 Sultan Ali-Adab - The sultan of Persia, father of Aladin
 Princess Floresca - Mother of Florante, princess of Crotona
 Duke Briseo - Father of Florante; the brother of King Linseo; child of AmarSilo
 Adolfo - Florante's rival, called "mapagbalat-kayo"; Great anger towards Florante
 Count Sileno - Father of Adolfo
 Menalipo - The cousin of Florante who saved him from a vulture when he was still a baby
 Menandro - A close friend of Florante, nephew of Antenor; saved Florante from Adolfo.
 Antenor - Teacher of Florante from Athens
 Emir - Muslim that had failed to murder Florante
 General Osmalik - General from Persia who fought in Crotona
 General Miramolin - General from Turkey
 General Abu Bakr - General from Persia, watched out for Flerida

References

1838 poems
Albania in fiction
Epic poems
Filipino poems